Hugo Buchthal (August 11, 1909-November 10, 1996) was a German-Jewish art historian, best known for his standard work Miniature Painting in the Latin Kingdom of Jerusalem (1957).

He studied at the Warburg Institute in Germany, emigrating in 1934 when it moved to London. From 1965 he held positions in the USA.

External links
Biography

1909 births
1996 deaths
German art historians
Historians of the Crusades
German expatriates in the United States
Jewish emigrants from Nazi Germany to the United Kingdom
20th-century German historians
German male non-fiction writers
Historians of Byzantine art